The 18th Central Commission for Discipline Inspection (CCDI) was elected at the 18th National Congress of the Chinese Communist Party on 14 November 2012. Its 1st Plenary Session elected the Secretary, deputy secretaries and the 18th Standing Committee of the CCDI.

Members

 Yu Chunsheng
 Ma Yongxia (female)
 Wang Wei
 Wang Wei
 Wang Changhe
 Wang Dongfeng
 Wang Liying (female) 
 Wang Zhongtian — formally expelled from the party at the Seventh Plenum in January 2017.
 Wang Huaqing
 Wang Huisheng
 Wang Qishan
 Wang Huaichen
 Wang Zhongmin
 Wang Hemin
 Wang Yilin
 Wang Xiaolong
 Wang Jiasheng
 Wang Binyi
 Wang Sentai 
 Wang Ruisheng 
 Dainzhub Ongboin (Tibetan)
 Yin Jinhua
 Shi Shenglong (Manchu)
 Ye Qingchun
 Shen Weichen — expelled at Fifth Plenum in January 2015.
 Fu Jianhua
 Feng Huimin (female)
 Ning Gaoning
 Hong Qiang (female) 
 Qu Qingshan 
 Qu Shuhui (female) — demoted and put on two-year party probation in July 2016
 Lu Jiancheng
 Ren Zemin
 Doje Radain (Tibetan) 
 Liu Bin
 Liu Changyin
 Liu Shengjie — dismissed at the Eighth Plenum in October 2017
 Liu Xiangsong
 Liu Jinguo
 Liu Jianhua (female) 
 Liu Xiaobin
 Liu Cigui
 Jiang Bixin
 An Limin (female)
 Su Bo
 Du Jincai
 Du Jinfu
 Li Ning
 Li Gang — put on one-year party probation in October 2017
 Li Xi
 Li Wusi
 Li Shulei
 Li Yufu
 Li Zhaoqian
 Li Faquan
 Li Jianbo — ordered to resign at the Seventh Plenum in January 2017.
 Li Shishi
 Li Qiufang (female)
 Li Jiaxiang
 Yang Lishun
 Yang Zhijin
 Yang Mingsheng
 Yang Xiaodu
 Xiao Yaqing
 Wu Gang

 Wu Yuliang
 Wu Jieming
 Cen Xu
 Qiu Xueqiang
 He Ping
 Yu Xinrong
 Xin Weiguang
 Wang Min
 Song Mingchang 
 Song Airong (female)
 Song Xuantao
 Zhang Li
 Zhang Jun
 Zhang Yong
 Zhang Lijun
 Zhang Jinan
 Zhang Changping
 Zhang Xiaolan (female)
 Zhang Xiaogang
 Chen Lun
 Chen Dawei 
 Chen Wenqing
 Chen Xunqiu
 Chen Jianmin
 Chen Xuguo
 Chen Xinquan
 Miao Hua
 Jin Shubo
 Zhou Ying (female)
 Zhou Zemin
 Zhou Fuqi
 Zheng Guoguang
 Zhao Hongzhu
 Hu Yumin (female)
 Hu Wenming
 Hou Kai
 Hou Chang'an
 Hou Hehua
 Yu Guilin
 Yao Zengke
 Yuan Yanpeng
 Geng Wenqing
 Geng Liaoyuan
 Chai Shaoliang
 Xu Jingye 
 Guo Yongping
 Guo Xiangyuan
 Huang Xianyao
 Huang Jianguo (Hunan)
 Huang Jianguo (People's Liberation Army)
 Huang Jiansheng
 Huang Shuxian
 Huang Xiaowei (female)
 Huang Dianzhong
 Cao Peixi
 Cui Shaopeng
 Liang Bin — expelled at Fifth Plenum in January 2015.
 Dong Li
 Han Henglin
 Xie Hangsheng
 Xie Guoming
 Qiang Weidong
 Zang Xianfu
 Xiong Weiping
 Li Xiaohong

References
General
The 18th CCDI composition was taken from this source:
  
Specific

Central Commission for Discipline Inspection
2012 establishments in China